The women's doubles of the 2021 I.ČLTK Prague Open tournament was played on clay in Prague, Czech Republic.

Nicoleta Dascălu and Raluca Șerban were the defending champions, but chose not to participate.

Anna Bondár and Kimberley Zimmermann won the title, defeating Xenia Knoll and Elena-Gabriela Ruse in the final, 7–6(7–5), 6–2.

Seeds

Draw

Draw

References

External Links
Main Draw

I.ČLTK Prague Open - Doubles
I.ČLTK Prague Open